The Somali crow, or dwarf raven (Corvus edithae), is approximately the size (44–46 cm in length) of the carrion crow, Corvus corone but with a longer bill and a somewhat more brownish cast to the feathers, especially when worn.

Distribution and Species
This species occurs principally in Somalia, Djibouti, the Ogaden and the Northern Frontier District in the Horn of Africa, and can be distinguished from the larger brown-necked raven C. ruficollis by its call, appearance and differences in its behaviour.

It was formerly considered a subspecies of the larger brown-necked raven (C. ruficollis), but is now considered to be a distinct species.

This crow is thought to be closer to the pied crow C. albus by some authorities, especially in its behaviour, than to the brown-necked raven. Hybrid birds between the pied crow and the Somali crow appear to reinforce this close relationship where the two species meet.

The nest is a ravenlike bulky structure set in either a lone tree or on telegraph poles. It will nest on cliffs in coastal regions or areas where trees are unavailable. The 3-5 eggs are laid in April and early May.

The voice is described as a harsh "caw" rather like the rook, Corvus frugilegus of Eurasia.

References

Somali crow
Birds of the Horn of Africa
Somali crow